Yunnanlu station, is a station on Line 4 of the Nanjing Metro, and a planned interchange station with the currently under-construction Line 5. It opened on January 18, 2017 alongside seventeen other stations as part of Line 4's first phase. The station is oriented on an east–west axis, underneath the intersection of Beijing West Road and Yunnan Road to the north and Shanghai Road to the south.

The station has five exits and sits on the northwestern corner of Nanjing University's Gulou campus and near the headquarters for the provincial electric company and a gaokao testing center.

References

Railway stations in Jiangsu
Railway stations in China opened in 2017
Nanjing Metro stations